Lucy Alexandra Newcombe (born 1975) is a female British former field hockey player

Hockey career
Newcombe represented England and won a silver medal, at the 1998 Commonwealth Games in Kuala Lumpur.

Personal life
Newcombe served in the Royal Air Force for 17 years and retired with the rank of Wing commander; she was commissioned in 1996.

References

1975 births
Living people
British female field hockey players
Commonwealth Games medallists in field hockey
Commonwealth Games silver medallists for England
Field hockey players at the 1998 Commonwealth Games
Medallists at the 1998 Commonwealth Games